Murphy Lake is a lake in Tuscola County, Michigan, United States. Murphy Lake lies at an elevation of 748 feet (228 m).

See also
List of lakes in Michigan

References

  
 

Lakes of Michigan
Bodies of water of Tuscola County, Michigan